Randallstown High School is a public high school located in Baltimore County, Maryland, United States. It serves students in the Randallstown, Woodlawn, and Owings Mills areas. It is a part of Baltimore County Public Schools. Its primary feeder schools are Deer Park Middle Magnet School, Woodlawn Middle School, Sudbrook Magnet Middle School, Southwest Academy Middle School, Windsor Mill Middle School and Old Court Middle School.

Academics
Randallstown High school received a 43.9 out of a possible 90 points (48%) on the 2018-2019 Maryland State Department of Education Report Card and received a 3 out of 5 star rating, ranking in the 26th percentile among all Maryland schools. Randallstown High School is home of 2 magnet programs, Academy of Health Professions & Multimedia Production.

Students
The 2019–2020 enrollment at Randallstown High School was 1048 students.

Athletics

State Championships
Football
Class AA 1984
4A 1990
Boys Basketball
Class A 1995
3A 2001, 2005
2A 2006, 2007
Baseball
Class AA 1985

Notable alumni
 Mitch Allan - singer/songwriter
 Brian Bark - former Major League Baseball player, current Chief Information Officer for Sinclair Broadcast Group
 Christian Benford- professional football player, cornerback for the Buffalo Bills
 D. J. Bryant - professional footballplayer
 James P. Clements  - President of Clemson University, former president of West Virginia University
 Marcus Cousin - professional basketball player
 Jae Deal - composer and music producer
 Khia Edgerton - Baltimore Club DJ, MC
 Kim English -  former professional basketball player and current head basketball coach for George Mason University
 Steven Oken - Convicted murderer executed in Maryland

Shooting   
On May 7, 2004, Randallstown High School was the scene of a school shooting. Due to a dispute between students at lunch earlier during the week, one of the students wanted to take matters into his own hands and get revenge.  At approximately 4:30pm after an annual basketball game between students, faculty, and Maryland State Delegates, a Randallstown student along with 3 of his friends began shooting in the front of the school grounds. 4 students were wounded including William "Tippa" Thomas who suffered paralysis.

References

External links

Public high schools in Maryland
Baltimore County Public Schools
Middle States Commission on Secondary Schools
Randallstown, Maryland
Educational institutions established in 1969
1969 establishments in Maryland